Sikhourou is a town and sub-prefecture in the Forécariah Prefecture in the Kindia Region of western Guinea, near the border of Sierra Leone.

References

Sub-prefectures of the Kindia Region